The 1993 All-Ireland Under-21 Hurling Championship final was a hurling match played to determine the winners of the 1993 All-Ireland Under-21 Hurling Championship, the 30th season of the All-Ireland Under-21 Hurling Championship, a tournament organised by the Gaelic Athletic Association for the champion teams of the four provinces of Ireland. The final was contested by Galway of Connacht and Kilkenny of Leinster, with the game ending in a 2-14 to 3-11 draw. Galway won the replay by 2-9 to 3-3

Details

Drawn match

Replay

References

1993 in hurling
All-Ireland Under-21 Hurling Championship Finals
Galway GAA matches
Kilkenny GAA matches